The Saharna Monastery is a monastery in Saharna, Moldova.

The "Holy Trinity" Monastery of Saharna, situated about 110 km north of Chișinău, on the west side of the Nistru River, is considered to be one of the biggest centres for religious pilgrimages in Moldova. Here can be found the unique relics of the Blessed Macarie, and on the top of the high cliff, according to a legend, there is a footprint of St. Maria, the Mother of Jesus. The legend says that a monk from the monastery once saw the shining figure of Saint Maria on the top of a rock. When reaching that spot the monk saw a mark of a footstep on the ground.

Gallery

References

External links 
 
 Site-ul Mănăstirei "Sfânta Treime" din s. Saharna
 Virtual tour on Saharna Monastery at visit.md 
 SAHARNA: amprente sfinte şi locuri de poveste at moldova.org 
 Manastirea Saharna at crestinortodox.ro 
 About Saharna Monastery at travelmoldova.eu 
 Articol din Jurnalul Naţional 
 Investigaţii arheologice în zona Saharna
 Mănăstirile Moldovei - Saharna

Religious buildings and structures in Moldova
Religious buildings and structures completed in 1776
Christian monasteries in Moldova
Christian monasteries established in the 18th century
Soroca District